Takanomyia is a genus of flies in the family Tachinidae.

Species
T. frontalis Shima, 1988
T. parafacialis (Sun & Chao, 1994)
T. rava Shima, 1988
T. scutellata Mesnil, 1957
T. takagii Shima, 1988

References

Exoristinae
Diptera of Asia
Tachinidae genera